Warren Sawkiw (born January 19, 1968) is a Canadian former professional baseball player and broadcaster.

Biography
Born in Toronto, Ontario, Sawkiw played college baseball for the Wake Forest Demon Deacons. In 1988 and 1989, he played collegiate summer baseball with the Bourne Braves of the Cape Cod Baseball League and was named a league all-star in 1989. He was selected by the Detroit Tigers in the 1990 Major League Baseball draft. He went on to play in minor league and independent baseball from 1990 to 1998, appearing in a total of 658 games, compiling a .277 batting average. He was primarily an infielder, but also served as a utility player, appearing at every defensive position including pitcher. He started his professional career in 1990 with the Class A Short Season Niagara Falls Rapids, advanced as far as Triple-A with the Syracuse Chiefs in 1995, and finished his career in baseball with the independent Elmira Pioneers in 1998.

After his retirement from baseball as a player, Sawkiw joined TSN as a colour commentator on Montreal Expos games in 2001 and then Rogers Sportsnet as a studio analyst for the network's baseball coverage in 2003.  After long-time Toronto Blue Jays radio broadcaster Tom Cheek was unable to serve as the team's lead radio play-by-play announcer in 2005 due to health issues, Sawkiw joined Jerry Howarth as an analyst on Blue Jays radio broadcasts.  Sawkiw continued working in this capacity through the 2006 season, with former Blue Jays catcher and Houston Astros broadcaster Alan Ashby replacing Sawkiw in the broadcast booth in 2007. Sawkiw did color commentary for CBC Sports' coverage of baseball at the 2008 Summer Olympics. Sawkiw also served as the announcer for CBC Sports' coverage of baseball at the 2015 Pan American Games.

References

External links

Major League Baseball broadcasters
Toronto Blue Jays announcers
Canadian baseball players
1968 births
Living people
Wake Forest Demon Deacons baseball players
Bourne Braves players
Niagara Falls Rapids players
Fayetteville Generals players
Lakeland Tigers players
Rochester Aces players
Birmingham Barons players
Thunder Bay Whiskey Jacks players
Winnipeg Goldeyes players
Knoxville Smokies players
Syracuse Chiefs players
Elmira Pioneers players
Canadian television sportscasters
Canadian radio sportscasters
Baseball players from Toronto